Bernard Drubay (born 19 July 1948) is a French sailor who competed in the 1972 Summer Olympics.

References

1948 births
Living people
French male sailors (sport)
Olympic sailors of France
Sailors at the 1972 Summer Olympics – Soling